The 1977 South American Basketball Championship for Women was the 16th regional tournament for women in South America. It was held in Lima, Peru and won by the local squad. Eight teams competed.

Results

Each team played the other teams twice, for a total of eight games played by each team.

Final rankings

External links
FIBA Archive

1977
1977 in women's basketball
1977 in Peruvian sport
Sports competitions in Santiago
March 1977 sports events in South America